Wheatland R-II School District (WSD) is a school district in Hickory County, Missouri with a jurisdiction over Wheatland, Missouri and the surrounding area. WSD has a graduation rate of 100%; 71% are eligible for free or reduced price lunches; and 56% of students head to college after graduation. The average teacher salary is $36,119. The school district spends $10,653 per student, slightly less than the national average

Schools

Elementary 
Wheatland Elementary (PreK-6)

High school 
Wheatland High School (6-12)

Demographics

References

Education in Hickory County, Missouri
School districts in Missouri
Buildings and structures in Hickory County, Missouri